Manoj Bohra (born 28 August 1982) known by his stage name Karanvir Bohra, is an Indian actor, producer and designer. He starred in the TV shows Kasautii Zindagii Kay. He is Know for playing The Negative Role of Viraj Dobriyal in  Dil Se Di Dua... Saubhagyavati Bhava?, Shararat, Rocky in Naagin 2 and Aahil in Qubool Hai and films Kismat Konnection, Mumbai 125 KM, Love Yoou Soniye and  Hume Tumse Pyaar Kitna. He participated in the reality shows Nach Baliye 4, Jhalak Dikhhla Jaa 6, Fear Factor: Khatron Ke Khiladi 5 and Bigg Boss 12.

Early life and education
Bohra was born on 28 August 1982 in Jodhpur to a Pushkarana brahmin family. He is the son of filmmaker Mahendra Bohra (born 3 July 1946) and grandson of actor-producer Ramkumar Bohra. Producer Sunil Bohra is his first cousin. He has two sisters, Meenakshi and Shivangi. He attended G D Somani Memorial School, Cuffe Parade. As a child he was not academically inclined and he was not good at sports as well. He did his junior college from Elphinstone College, Mumbai in Science but he left science as he was unsuccessful in his twelfth grade. Later he took admission in Sydenham College, Churchgate and did his Bachelor of Commerce. Bohra received training in the Kathak dance style for two years with Pandit Veeru Krishnan.

Personal life

Bohra married model-VJ Teejay Sidhu at the Sri Sri Ravishankar Ashram, Bengaluru on 3 November 2006.

In 2007, Bohra changed his name from Manoj to Karanvir. Earlier Bohra and his wife lived at Lokhandwala in Andheri, Mumbai, and in 2014, he shifted to Goregaon, a locality in the Mumbai Suburban district.

Bohra has been involved in cleanliness and meditation activities. In June 2016, Bohra and Sidhu announced that they were expecting their first child. On 19 October 2016, they became parents of twin girls, Raya Bella Bohra and Vienna Bohra.

On 28 August 2020, the couple announced that they were expecting their third child. On 16 December 2020, they became parents to a third daughter named Gia Vanessa Snow Bohra.

Career
Bohra's first acting role was as a child artist in Tejaa (1990). Bohra made his television debut with the role of Kabir in DJ's a Creative Unit's Just Mohabbat. Later he worked as an assistant to B. P. Singh working on the detective series C.I.D and later for Achanak 37 Saal Baad. He had his first leading role with Ronnie Screwvala's Shararat, a comedy fantasy show where he played Dhruv. Bohra also played minor parts in Kyunki Saas Bhi Kabhi Bahu Thi (2007) Kkusum (2008). In 2005, he joined the star cast of the show Kasautii Zindagii Kay. He played the character of Prem Basu, a spoilt brat. later in mid 2007 he quit the show to pursue his Bollywood career. In 2008, Bohra hosted Ek Se Badhkar Ek with Tina Parekh. In the same year Bohra participated in dance reality shows like Nach Baliye 4 with his wife Teejay Sidhu and in Kabhi Kabhii Pyaar Kabhi Kabhii Yaar with his wife Tejay Sidhu and Tina Parekh.

In 2008, Bohra did a cameo role in Aziz Mirza's film Kismat Konnection playing the character of Dev Kataria, a spoilt brat and businessman. Taran Adarsh of the entertainment portal Bollywood Hungama wrote of his performance, "Bohra acts well". In 2011, Bohra made his comeback to television with Dil Se Di Dua... Saubhagyavati Bhava? He played the role of Viraj Dobriyal, a psychotic lover who has mood swings and suffers from obsessive–compulsive disorder for cleanliness. The show ended on 18 January 2013. Alongside doing Dil Se Di Dua... Saubhagyavati Bhava?, he contested in Welcome – Baazi Mehmaan Nawazi Ki, a food reality show and in Jhalak Dikhhla Jaa 6, a dance reality show. 

In 2013 , Bohra  did his debut in regional Punjabi film, Love Yoou Soniye with his wife Teejay Sidhu. Bohra and Sidhu themselves produced the film. In 2013, he did Telugu director Hemant Madhukar's Mumbai 125 KM, alongside Veena Malik and Vedita Pratap Singh. The film grossed  domestically. In June 2012, he launched his own line of clothing for men, Pegasus, in association with fashion designer Ammy Billmoria. In March 2014, Bohra with his wife Tejay Sidhu participated in  Fear Factor: Khatron Ke Khiladi 5. In 2014, he replaced Abhay Deol in Balaji Telefilms documentary show Gumrah: End of Innocence 4 as the host of the season 4. However, Bohra quit the show in May 2015, as the show was facing a financial crunch and the makers were asking him to reduce his monies.

In April 2014, Bohra entered Zee TV's Qubool Hai opposite Surbhi Jyoti. He played Aahil Raza Ibrahim, who is snobbish, unpredictable, volatile, rebel biker with a dry sense of humor. In March 2015, he decided to leave the show citing that taking his character further would just be stretching it. Although, later he decided to return to the show. Later Bohra quit the show in July 2015 as the production house of the show planned a 20 years leap. The show Qubool Hai ended in January 2016.

In October 2016, he joined the cast of Naagin 2 as Rocky Pratap Singh, opposite Mouni Roy and Adaa Khan. The show received high TRPs and ended in June 2017. He also hosted the reality television show India's Best Judwaah on Zee TV the same year.

Bohra was a celebrity contestant in the Bigg Boss 12  the Indian version of the reality TV show Big Brother. He entered the house on 16 September 2018 and got eliminated from 5th place on 30 December.

In July 2019, Bohra starred alongside Priya Banerjee and Samir Kochhar in a romantic thriller film Hume Tumse Pyaar Kitna produced by his father Mahendra Bohra. Upon its release the film received mixed reviews from critics with praise towards Bohra's performance.

In January 2020, Bohra announced that he is set to make his digital debut with Zee5's thriller web series The Casino. The show was released during the COVID-19 lockdown in India. He played the role of Vikramaditya Marwah aka Vicky who is the heir to his father's multi-billionaire business but falls into the trap of his father's mistress. Bohra also served as one of the co-producers on the show. Upon its release, the show generally received negative reviews from critics and mixed responses from audience. Later the same year he appeared in another Zee5 web series Bhanwar alongside his wife Teejay Sidhu and Hume Tumse Pyaar Kitna co-star Priya Banerjee. He also made his directorial debut through this show. The show was based on time travel and was much better received than his previous show.

In February 2022, he entered the web reality show Lock Upp as a contestant. During the show he made some shocking revelations regarding his personal and professional life. He was eliminated from the show on Day 52.

Filmography

Television

Web series

Awards

References

External links

Living people
1982 births
People from Jodhpur
21st-century Indian male actors
Indian male film actors
Indian male television actors
Male actors in Hindi cinema
Indian television presenters
Bigg Boss (Hindi TV series) contestants
Fear Factor: Khatron Ke Khiladi participants
Indian Hindus